Basking may refer to:

Basking in reflected glory, associating oneself with successful other such that their success becomes one's own
Basking Ridge, New Jersey, unincorporated area in Bernards Township in the Somerset Hills region of Somerset County, New Jersey
Basking Ridge (NJT station), New Jersey Transit station in Bernards Township, New Jersey
Basking shark, Cetorhinus maximus, is the second largest living fish, after the whale shark
Sunning (behaviour) or Basking behaviour used to raise body temperature, exhibited by some animals (see ectotherm)